Westwood is a census-designated place (CDP) in Valley Township in Chester County, Pennsylvania. The population was 950 at the 2010 census.

Geography
Valley Road (Pennsylvania Route 372) passes through the center of the village, connecting Coatesville with Pomeroy and Parkesburg to the west.

References

Census-designated places in Chester County, Pennsylvania
Census-designated places in Pennsylvania